Wilangan Station (station code: WLG) is a defunct third-class railway station in Wilangan, Wilangan, Nganjuk Regency, East Java, Indonesia, operated by Kereta Api Indonesia. This railway station is at the most western railway station in Nganjuk Regency. This railway station is located near Nganjuk Regency and Madiun Regency border.

This railway station has been deactivated since Nganjuk–Babadan double-track segment activation on 30 April 2019.

Gallery

References

External links 

 Kereta Api Indonesia - Indonesian railway company's official website

Nganjuk Regency
Railway stations in East Java
Wilangan